William Henry Campbell (February 2, 1896 – October 28, 1968), nicknamed "Bullet" and "Zip", was an American Negro league pitcher in the 1920s.

A native of Savannah, Georgia, Campbell made his Negro leagues debut in 1923 with the Washington Potomacs. He spent most of his career with the Hilldale Club, and played for Hilldale during its 1925 Colored World Series championship season, though it does not appear that Campbell pitched in the championship series. Campbell finished his career in 1929 with the Lincoln Giants. He died in Boston, Massachusetts in 1968 at age 72.

References

External links
 and Baseball-Reference Black Baseball stats and Seamheads

1896 births
1968 deaths
Hilldale Club players
Lincoln Giants players
Washington Potomacs players
20th-century African-American sportspeople
Baseball pitchers